Wolfgang Ender (born 8 October 1946) is a Liechtensteiner former alpine skier who competed in the 1968 Winter Olympics.

Ender crashed during training days before the 1964 Winter Olympics, the crash occurred only minutes after the death of Australian athlete Ross Milne.

References

External links
 

1946 births
Living people
Liechtenstein male alpine skiers
Olympic alpine skiers of Liechtenstein
Alpine skiers at the 1968 Winter Olympics